The 2014 Badminton Oceania Championships was the 9th tournament of the Oceania Badminton Championships. It was held in Ballarat, Australia from February 10 to February 15, 2014.

Venue 
Ken Kay Badminton Stadium

Medalists

Individual event

Team Event

Medal table

External links
oceaniabadminton.org
Results at tournamentsoftware.com

Oceania Badminton Championships
Oceania Badminton Championships
Oceania Badminton Championships
Oceania Badminton Championships
International sports competitions hosted by Australia